Awa Traoré (Arabic: أوا تراوري), is a Malian filmmaker and film actress. Apart from direction, Traoré is also an assistant director, composer and writer.

Career
Traoré started her career with 1995 film L'enfant noir. Then she acted as the 'huntress' in the 1993 short film Denko directed by Mohamed Camara. The film received critical acclaim and won the Grand Prix at the Clermont-Ferrand International Short Film Festival, the award for Best Short film at the Fribourg International Film Festival and the Golden Danzante award at the Huesca Film Festival.

Filmography

References

External links
 

Living people
Documentary film directors
Malian film directors
20th-century Malian actresses
Year of birth missing (living people)
21st-century Malian actresses
Malian film actresses